The 1990 Alabama gubernatorial election was held on November 6, 1990, to select the governor of Alabama. The election saw incumbent Republican Governor Guy Hunt defeat Democrat Paul Hubbert, executive secretary of the Alabama Education Association. This marked the first time in history that a Republican won a second gubernatorial term in Alabama.

Democratic primary

The Democratic primary saw teachers' union head Paul Hubbert defeat Attorney General of Alabama Don Siegelman for the Democratic nomination. No candidate gained a majority in the 5 June primary requiring a runoff between the top two candidates.

Primary election

Candidates
 Charles Bishop, State Senator
 Ed Daw
 Ronnie Flippo, U.S. Representative
 Paul Hubbert, Executive Secretary of the Alabama Education Association
 Fob James, former Governor
 Don Siegelman, Attorney General

Results

Source: 1990 Gubernatorial Democratic Primary Election Results – Alabama

Runoff election

Source: 1990 Gubernatorial Democratic Runoff Election Results – Alabama

Election result

References

Recent Alabama gubernatorial election results

1990
Gubernatorial
Alabama